Belgrade Township is an inactive township in Washington County, in the U.S. state of Missouri.

Belgrade Township most likely takes its name from the community of Belgrade, Missouri.

References

Townships in Missouri
Townships in Washington County, Missouri